is Japanese former gymnast.

He was a member of the Japanese team that won the gold medal at the 1976 Summer Olympics in Montreal.

He is a professor at Niigata University.

References

1951 births
Living people
Japanese male artistic gymnasts
Olympic gymnasts of Japan
Gymnasts at the 1976 Summer Olympics
Olympic gold medalists for Japan
Olympic medalists in gymnastics
Medalists at the 1976 Summer Olympics
20th-century Japanese people
21st-century Japanese people